Svetlana Mičić (born 28 May 1960) is a Croatian handball player. She competed in the women's tournament at the 1988 Summer Olympics.

References

External links
 

1960 births
Living people
Croatian female handball players
Olympic handball players of Yugoslavia
Handball players at the 1988 Summer Olympics
People from Požega, Croatia
20th-century Croatian women